The Ineos Oxford Institute for Antimicrobial Research (IOI) is a multidisciplinary research institute at the University of Oxford. The IOI was established in January 2021 thanks to a £100 donation from INEOS, one of the world’s largest manufacturing companies. 

The institute collaborates across the University of Oxford and far beyond, but is rooted in the Departments of Chemistry and Biology, and aims to rapidly advance research, education and collaboration in search of solutions to tackle the growing threat of antimicrobial resistance (AMR).

References 

Antimicrobial resistance organizations
Biological research institutes in the United Kingdom
Ineos
Research institutes of the University of Oxford
2021 establishments in the United Kingdom